Belén  Marta Rodríguez Gómez, better known as Belén Rodríguez or simply Belén Ro, (Madrid, March 23, 1966), is a Spanish journalist and television collaborator who has been part of more than fifteen television programs dedicated to the tabloids.

Biography 
Born into a family of journalists, she is the daughter of Pedro Rodrguez andChari Gómez Miranda (popularly known on television as "Doña Adelaida") and the sister of journalist Pedro Rodrguez Gómez.

Her specialization is the tabloids and reality shows. Her career in television began in the nineties, in TVE,  behind the cameras of María Teresa Campos' programs. Her first time in front of the cameras was in the program Día a Día, in Telecinco, where she acted as a collaborator. Soon after, she begins to participate in the Gran Hermano, debates, where she remained until the contest's conclusion in 2017. In 2003, the journalist changed channels and began to collaborate with Antena 3, in the program Sabor a Ti, presented by Ana Rosa Quintana.

From 2005 to 2015, she worked on Telecinco's El programa de Ana Rosa, which she co–hosted with La Noria since 2008 until its cancellation in 2012. Later, she appeared on Telecinco in Enemigos íntimos, ¡Qué tiempo tan feliz! and Viva la vida. She has also participated as a contestant in the contest ¡Mira quién salta! presented by Jesús Vázquez on Telecinco.

She collaborates in Sálvame from 2012 to 2014, and she returns in 2016. leaves the program again in 2019 after her harsh confrontations with Antonio David Flores. Since then, she has participated in Ya es mediodía, La casa fuerte and Mujeres y hombres y viceversa. She returns as a collaborator to Sábado Deluxe in 2021.

Trajectory

References

External links 
 Belén Rodríguez on Instagram

Spanish television personalities
Spanish television presenters
Living people
1966 births